Egattur is a village in Kanchipuram district of Tamil Nadu, located on the southern outskirts of Chennai, India. It is a suburban area near the SIPCOT IT Park, Siruseri. It is located between Navalur and Kazhipathur along the Old Mahabalipuram Road parallel to Muttukadu on the East Coast Road.

Geography 
It also borders the Buckingham Canal that runs into the Muttukadu backwaters. Illegal dumping and environmental pollution have been serious concerns for Egattur residents.

Transportation 
The bus stop outside SIPCOT IT Park is the main bus stand of Egattur region.

Education
The Mohammad Sathak A. J. College of Engineering is located in this region.

Notable people
 Ekambaram Karunakaran

References 

Egattur_(Chengalpattu_District)
Suburbs of Chennai